Joseph Garland Moore Jr. (September 4, 1920 - November 3, 1985), known as Gar Moore was an actor in Italian and American films. He was also in several theatrical productions.

He was born in Chelsea, Oklahoma. He had a short marriage to Nancy Walker.

Filmography
Paisan (1946)
To Live in Peace (1947) as Ronald
Johnny Stool Pigeon (1949) as Sam Harrison'
Illegal Entry (film) (1949) as Lee Sloan
Abbott and Costello Meet the Killer, Boris Karloff (1949) as Jeff Wilson 
The Underworld Story (1950) as Clark Stanton 
The Vicious Years (1950) as Luca Rossi 
The Girl in White (1952)
Curse of the Faceless Man (1958) as Dr. Enrico Ricci

Shows
Bells Are Ringing at the Sacramento Music Circus

References

Actors from Oklahoma
1920 births
1985 deaths